"Chase the Devil" is a reggae song, recorded in 1976 by Max Romeo, with the backing of Lee "Scratch" Perry's house band, The Upsetters.

Background
Composed by Perry and Romeo, "Chase the Devil" was released on the album War Ina Babylon in 1976. Also in 1976, The Upsetters recorded a version with different lyrics. The track, called "Croaking Lizard" and credited to The Upsetters and Prince Jazzbo, was included in their album Super Ape. Later, Perry made a dub remix of both versions, called "Disco Devil".

In a BBC interview recorded in 2010 Romeo describes the meaning of the song. He explains that the devil is everything negative in our minds, the iron shirt is our strength of spirit that allows us to cast out the devil.

Track listing
7" UK Single
A. Max Romeo – "Chase the Devil"
B. The Upsetters featuring Prince Jazzbo – "Croaking Lizard"

7" French Single
A. "Chase the Devil" – 3:25
B. "One Step Forward (Oye Oye Reggae)" – 5:00

Cover versions
"Out of Space" by The Prodigy (1992) sampled the song.
Kanye West has used resung samples from "Chase the Devil" to produce Jay Z's song "Lucifer", which appeared on Jay Z's 2003 release, The Black Album.
Madness covered the song for their cover album, The Dangermen Sessions Vol. 1, released in 2005.
Dreadzone sampled the song for their 2006 track "Iron Shirt".
Earl Sixteen covered the song in 2008: other reggae acts who have recorded their own versions include Macka B, Susan Cadogan and Mad Professor.

References

1976 singles
1976 songs
Reggae songs
Songs written by Lee "Scratch" Perry
Songs written by Max Romeo
Madness (band) songs